Alice Miriam Olivia Garner is an Australian actor, author, musician, teacher and historian.

She is the daughter of Australian novelist and screenwriter Helen Garner and playwright, historian and actor Bill Garner.

Acting life and career
Garner's acting career began as a child in the 1982 film Monkey Grip adapted from her mother's 1977 novel of the same name, which Alice featured in as a character, under the name of Gracie. She was nominated for an AFI Award for her role. She starred in Love And Other Catastrophes in 1996, winning the Film Critics Circle of Australia award for best supporting actress, and played the role of Carmen in the popular ABC TV series SeaChange. Other credits include films Jindabyne, Strange Planet and award-winning short film Maidenhead, and on television, the role of Caitlin in Secret Life of Us.

In September 2001 she and Kate Atkinson (with whom she had worked on SeaChange) founded Actors for Refugees, to counter negative stereotyping of refugees and asylum seekers through public readings by volunteer performers around Australia.

In 2014, she joined a team of presenters on three series of a television documentary series about the Australian coastline, Coast Australia (History Channel), hosted by archaeologist Neil Oliver. Garner presented stories about social and cultural history.

Academic life and career
Garner speaks French and in 2001 gained a Ph.D. in French history from the University of Melbourne for her study of representations of sea and shore in south-western France. 

Garner held an ARC Linkage postdoctoral research fellowship at La Trobe University from 2009 to 2012, researching the history of the Australian-American Fulbright Program. As part of this project, Garner recorded 23 whole-of-life interviews with Fulbright scholars for the National Library of Australia's oral history and folklore collection.

She has also begun to research the history of hitchhiking. 

She has published three books:
The Student Chronicles (MUP 2006), a memoir of her undergraduate years at Melbourne University
  A Shifting Shore: Locals, Outsiders, and the Transformation of a French Fishing Town, 1823–2000 (Cornell University Press, 2005), which was shortlisted for the NSW Premier's General History Prize in the year it was published. 
With historian Diane Kirkby, she co-authored Academic Ambassadors, Pacific Allies: Australia, America and the Fulbright Program (Manchester University Press, 2018).

Since January 2020 she has been based in the Centre for Vocational and Educational Policy at the Melbourne Graduate School of Education (University of Melbourne), researching the history of trade union training in Australia for an ARC Linkage project, bringing together historians, vocational educationalists and industrial law experts.

Teaching 
Garner became involved in community actions to support her local government secondary school and this inspired her to train in secondary teaching at Victoria University (2013-2014). She worked as a French and History teacher at Albert Park College from 2015 to 2019 and co-led the Languages curriculum team with colleague Tasha Brown.

Music life
She has been playing cello since the age of ten, and was a long-time member of the Xylouris Ensemble. The ensemble, led by Giorgos Xylouris on Laouto, performed contemporary, original and traditional Cretan music and released several studio albums. 

Garner currently plays in a trio, the endlings, with David Bowers and Dee Hannan, and has also played with euphonia with Mairead Hannan and Dee Hannan.

Awards
 1982 – nominated for the Australian Film Institute Award for Best Actress in a Supporting Role, for Monkey Grip
 1996 – nominated for the Australian Film Institute Awards, Best Actress in a Supporting Role for Love and Other Catastrophes
 1997 – won Film Critics Circle of Australia Award for Best Supporting Actor – Female, for Love and Other Catastrophes
 2002 – won the Screen Music Awards, Australia for Best Soundtrack Album, for One Night the Moon shared with Mairead Hannan, Paul Kelly, Kev Carmody, John Romeril, Deirdre Hannan
 2005 – shortlisted for the New South Wales Premier's History Awards General History Prize for A Shifting Shore: locals, outsiders and the transformation of a French fishing town, 1823–2000
 2015 – Victoria University Medal for Excellence in Postgraduate Studies

Personal life 

Garner is married with three children.

Filmography

Film

Television

Bibliography 

 A Shifting Shore: Locals, Outsiders, And The Transformation Of A French Fishing Town, 1823–2000, Cornell University Press, published 31 January 2005, .
 The Student Chronicles, Melbourne University Publishing, 2006
 co-authored with Diane Kirkby, Academic Ambassadors, Pacific Allies: Australia, America and the Fulbright Program (Manchester University Press, 2018)

References

External links 
 
 Actors for Refugees web site
 Alice Garner Biography
 University of Melbourne media release 31 August 2005 on Garner's appointment
 Xylouris Ensemble web site

1969 births
Living people
APRA Award winners
Australian film actresses
Australian women writers
University of Melbourne alumni
Australian television actresses
Actresses from Melbourne
Writers from Melbourne